The 2019 Intrust Super Cup was the PNG Hunters sixth season in the Queensland Cup after securing their future for the next four years until 2022. Adex Wera was the captain of the team and he was assisted by his deputy Moses Meninga The Hunters only won four of their games and drew one with a record eighteen losses for the season. 18 new players made their debuts while poor form and discipline let the team down. Five Hunters players were named in the Papua New Guinea Kumuls squad for the  2019 Oceania Cup (rugby league) Pool B Ox & Palm Pacific Invitational Tests against Toa Samoa and  Fiji Bati and also for the match against the touring Great Britain Lions .

Season Summary

2019 squad

Squad movement

Gains

Losses

Ladder 

 The team highlighted in blue has clinched the minor premiership
 Teams highlighted in green have qualified for the finals
 The team highlighted in red has clinched the wooden spoon

Regular season

Statistics

Honours

References

Queensland Cup
2019 in Australian rugby league
2019 in Papua New Guinea rugby league
2019 in rugby league by club
Papua New Guinea Hunters